Mathilda Grace Carmichael (born 4 April 1994) is an Australian cricketer who plays as a right-handed batter for Western Australia in the Women's National Cricket League (WNCL) and Perth Scorchers in the Women's Big Bash League (WBBL). Originally from Sydney, she was previously a member of the Hockeyroos field hockey squad. After missing out on selection for the 2016 Summer Olympics, she took up top level domestic women's cricket, but also continued playing hockey.

References

External links

Mathilda Carmichael at Cricket Australia

1994 births
Australian women cricketers
Cricketers from Sydney
Living people
Perth Scorchers (WBBL) cricketers
Sportswomen from New South Wales
Western Australia women cricketers